Dan Fogelman (born February 19, 1976) is an American television producer and screenwriter whose screenplays include Cars, Tangled, and Crazy, Stupid, Love. He also created the 2012 television sitcom The Neighbors, the 2015 fairy tale-themed musical comedy series Galavant, the 2016 drama series This Is Us, and the 2016 baseball drama series Pitch.

Biography
Fogelman grew up in what he has called an "endearingly dysfunctional" Jewish family in River Vale, New Jersey. He attended Pascack Valley High School in nearby Hillsdale. He attended the University of Pennsylvania and graduated in 1997. He and his mother, Joyce, took a road trip from New Jersey to Las Vegas that became the basis for his 2012 film comedy The Guilt Trip, starring Barbra Streisand and Seth Rogen as a mother and son on a cross-country road trip. His father, named Marty, became the namesake of the father in the 2012 television sitcom The Neighbors created by Fogelman, who has a sister who inspired the family daughter in this series. He is married to Caitlin Thompson, who stars as Madison on his family drama This Is Us and they share a son together born in 2020.

Filmography

Films

Television films

Television series

References

External links

1979 births
American male screenwriters
American television writers
Animation screenwriters
Jewish American writers
Living people
American male television writers
Pascack Valley High School alumni
People from River Vale, New Jersey
Pixar people
Screenwriters from New Jersey
This Is Us
Walt Disney Animation Studios people
Television producers from New Jersey